The 2019–20 season was Rotherham United's 95th season in their existence and the first back in the League One following relegation last season. The club also participated in the FA Cup, the EFL Cup and the EFL Trophy.

Key Events
Rotherham occupied second place in the League One table when the season was temporarily suspended on 31 March 2020, due to the COVID-19 pandemic.

Promotion back to the Championship was confirmed on 9 June 2020, when the EFL clubs voted to accept a proposal which would curtail the League One season and decide league positions on a points-per-game basis.

Squad statistics

Player statistics
 
Players with zero appearances have been unused substitutes in one or more games.

Goalscorers

Pre-season friendlies
The club confirmed their usual opening pre-season friendly with Parkgate on 9 May 2019. A second friendly, at Farsley Celtic was announced on 14 May. A third friendly at Chesterfield was announced on 16 May. On 21 May the first home friendly, against Leicester City, was announced. A trip to Bradford Park Avenue was confirmed on 23 May 2019. A second home friendly, against West Brom was announced on 24 May 2019.

On 28 May 2019 the club announced that 1. FC Magdeburg would be the opposition for one of the games to take place during their German training camp.

Competitions

League One

League table

Results summary

Results by matchday

Matches
On Thursday, 20 June 2019, the EFL League One fixtures were revealed.

FA Cup

The first round draw was made on 21 October 2019. The second round draw was made live on 11 November from Chichester City's stadium, Oaklands Park. The third round draw was made live on BBC Two from Etihad Stadium, Micah Richards and Tony Adams conducted the draw.

EFL Cup

The first round draw was made on 20 June. The second round draw was made on 13 August 2019 following the conclusion of all but one first round matches.

EFL Trophy

On 9 July 2019, the pre-determined group stage draw was announced with Invited clubs to be drawn on 12 July 2019.

Table

Matches

Transfers

Transfers in

Loans in

Loans out

Transfers out

References

Rotherham United
Rotherham United F.C. seasons